The Melody Top Theatre was a musical theatre located in Milwaukee, Wisconsin and featured performances in the round. The theatre that was originally built as a circus-style tent is now defunct.

History
The Melody Top was built in 1962.  It was only operational during the summers beginning in 1963. The theatre was modeled after the identical Melody Top in Chicago. The large venue lasted until 1986. The theatre was originally built in the form of a giant, circus-style tent.  It was located on W Good Hope Road, just east of N 76th St in Milwaukee.  Later, the architecture of the venue comprised a wooden dome. The Milwaukee Melody Top was affiliated with a second Melody Top located in Hillside, Illinois.

The Melody Top hosted "...Broadway quality presentations of big scale musical hits..."  The theatre hosted celebrities such as Leonard Nimoy in Oliver!; Betty White in My Fair Lady; and Christopher Walken in West Side Story.

Productions

1963 
Guys and Dolls - starring Gordon and Sheila MacRae
The Music Man - starring Forrest Tucker
The Unsinkable Molly Brown - starring Jaye P. Morgan
The Vagabond King - starring Earl Wrightson and Lois Hunt
Bye Bye Birdie - starring Van Johnson
Brigadoon - starring Dennis Day and McLean Stevenson

1964 
Kiss Me, Kate - starring Howard Keel
Gentlemen Prefer Blondes - starring Betty Hutton
Wildcat - starring Martha Raye
Roberta - starring Edward Everett Horton
Little Me - starring Gabriel Dell and Karen Morrow
Mr. President - starring Bert Parks
The Pajama Game - starring Phil Ford and Mimi Hines

1965 
West Side Story - starring Anna Maria Alberghetti and Christopher Walken
South Pacific - starring Betty White and Gene Hollmann
Bells Are Ringing - starring Phil Ford and Mimi Hines
My Fair Lady - starring Michael Allinson and Barbara Williams
Annie Get Your Gun - starring Jaye P. Morgan and Gary Mann
The Sound of Music - starring Janet Blair and John Myhers
Camelot - starring Earl Wrightson and Lois Hunt

1966 
The King and I - starring Gisele MacKenzie
Can-Can - starring Monique van Vooren
Gypsy - starring Janis Paige
Flower Drum Song - starring Chita Rivera
Milk and Honey - starring Molly Picon
Call Me Madam - starring Margaret Whiting and Tommy Sands
How to Succeed in Business Without Really Trying - starring Robert Q. Lewis and Karen Morrow

1967 
Sweet Charity - starring Gretchen Wyler
Lady in the Dark - starring Patrice Munsel
High Button Shoes - starring Margaret Whiting and Gabriel Dell
Silk Stockings - starring Earl Wrightson and Lois Hunt
The Boy Friend - starring Jane Powell
On a Clear Day You Can See Forever - starring Forrest Tucker
Carousel - starring John Raitt

1968 
Irma la Douce - starring Chita Rivera
Fanny - starring Anna Maria Alberghetti
Where's Charley? - starring Gabriel Dell and Eileen Brennan
Take Me Along - starring Robert Q. Lewis
Pal Joey - starring Margaret Whiting
The Desert Song - starring Anne Jeffreys and Bill Hayes
Of Thee I Sing - starring Hal March and Jack Bailey

1969 
The Roar of the Greasepaint – The Smell of the Crowd - starring Phil Ford and Mimi Hines
Carnival! - starring Jean-Pierre Aumont and Marisa Pavan
Paint Your Wagon - starring Earl Wrightson
Anything Goes - starring Gretchen Wyler
The Most Happy Fella - starring Anna Maria Alberghetti and Edwin Steffe
Song of Norway - starring Anne Jeffreys and Bill Hayes
Oklahoma! - starring John Raitt

1970 
I Do! I Do! -  starring Earl Wrightson and Lois Hunt
Mame - starring Kaye Stevens
Cabaret - starring Imogene Coca, Tommy Tune and King Donovan
How Now, Dow Jones - starring Robert Q. Lewis and Selma Diamond
Li'l Abner - starring Peter Palmer and Joy Garrett
Funny Girl - starring Jaye P. Morgan
Show Boat - starring Ann Blyth

1971 
Hello, Dolly! - starring Dorothy Lamour and Jack Bailey
Fiddler on the Roof - starring Earl Wrightson and Lois Hunt
George M! - starring Michael Callan
Damn Yankees - starring Van Johnson
Meet Me In St. Louis - starring Jane Powell
Plain and Fancy - starring Margaret Whiting and Carl Betz
Kismet - starring John Raitt

1972 
The Sound of Music - starring Ann Blyth
Kiss Me, Kate - starring Earl Wrightson and Lois Hunt
1776 - starring John Raitt and Stubby Kaye
Little Me - starring Arte Johnson and Karen Morrow
Oliver! - starring Leonard Nimoy
Company - starring Gretchen Wyler and Ed Evanko
Man of La Mancha - starring Earl Wrightson

1973 
West Side Story - starring James Darren
South Pacific - starring Ann Blyth
Applause - starring Gretchen Wyler
Wonderful Town - starring Sheila MacRae
Promises, Promises - starring Orson Bean
Brigadoon - starring Jane Powell
The Music Man - starring Van Johnson

1974 
No, No, Nanette - starring Penny Singleton and Arthur Lake
Finian's Rainbow - starring Arte Johnson
Gigi - starring Earl Wrightson and Lois Hunt
Guys and Dolls - starring George Chakiris and Rita Moreno
Once Upon A Mattress - starring Jo Anne Worley
Sugar - starring Orson Bean
The King and I - starring Leonard Nimoy and Anne Jeffreys

1975 
Good News - starring Dorothy Collins and Carl Betz
Annie Get Your Gun - starring John Raitt and Karen Morrow
Bitter Sweet - starring Ann Blyth
Zorba - starring Giorgio Tozzi
The Unsinkable Molly Brown - starring Mimi Hines and Peter Palmer
Gypsy - starring Margaret Whiting, Dave Madden and Linda Kaye Henning
Camelot - starring Ed Ames

1976 
A Funny Thing Happened on the Way to the Forum - starring Arte Johnson and Dave Madden
1776 - starring Ross Martin and Stubby Kaye
My Fair Lady - starring Leonard Nimoy
Bells Are Ringing - starring Rita Moreno and Tab Hunter
A Little Night Music - starring Earl Wrightson and Lois Hunt
Shenandoah - starring John Raitt
Irene - starring Jane Powell

1977 
Bye Bye Birdie - starring Lucie Arnaz and Michael Callan
How to Succeed in Business Without Really Trying - starring Van Johnson
The Merry Widow - starring Richard Fredricks and Linda Michele
Follies- starring Dorothy Collins and Anne Jeffreys
The Wizard of Oz - starring Stubby Kaye and Nancy Kulp
The Pajama Game - starring Ruta Lee, Don Stewart and Alan Sues
Fiddler on the Roof - starring Giorgio Tozzi

1978 
The Sound of Music - starring Anna Maria Alberghetti
Peter Pan - starring Nancy Dussault and Alan Sues
High Button Shoes - starring Monty Hall and Anne Jeffreys
On a Clear Day You Can See Forever - starring Gene Barry and Joy Garrett
Anything Goes - starring Jo Anne Worley
Pippin - starring Barry Williams
Man of La Mancha - starring John Raitt

1979 
Mame - starring Gretchen Wyler
Paint Your Wagon - starring Howard Keel
A Connecticut Yankee - starring Earl Wrightson and Lois Hunt
The Boy Friend - starring Vivian Blaine and Don Grady
Call Me Madam - starring Nanette Fabray
Lullaby of Broadway - starring Johnny Desmond
Show Boat - starring Margaret Hamilton and Ed Herlihy

1980 
The Wiz - starring Irene Cara and Ira Hawkins
Where's Charley? - starring Eddie Mekka and Kitty Carlisle
Chicago - starring Robert Mandan
Hello, Dolly! - starring Jo Anne Worley
South Pacific - starring Giorgio Tozzi
Can-Can - starring Sue Ane Langdon and John Phillip Law
The Student Prince - starring Jack Gilford
Grease - starring Barry Williams

1981 
The Music Man - starring Orson Bean
Camelot - starring Anna Maria Alberghetti
The Unsinkable Molly Brown - starring Jane Powell
Funny Girl - starring Mimi Hines and George Chakiris
Oklahoma! - starring Barry Williams
Cabaret - starring Jacqueline Schultz and Louisa Flaningam
Shenandoah - starring Giorgio Tozzi
The Debbie Reynolds Show - starring Debbie Reynolds

1982 
Guys and Dolls - starring Johnny Desmond, Sue Ane Langdon and Stubby Kaye
West Side Story - starring Barry Williams
Meet Me In St. Louis - starring Andrea McArdle
Fiddler on the Roof - starring Tom Poston
The Pirates of Penzance - starring Doug Sheehan
Fanny - starring John Raitt
Annie Get Your Gun - starring Jo Anne Worley

1983 
Barnum - starring Larry Kert
Annie - starring Peggy Cass
George M! - starring Eddie Mekka
Promises, Promises - starring Desi Arnaz Jr.
Little Me - starring Arte Johnson and Penny Singleton
Seven Brides for Seven Brothers - starring Jason Kincaid
They're Playing Our Song - starring Robert Walden

1984 
Gypsy - starring Jo Anne Worley
Oliver! - starring Bill and Susan Seaforth Hayes
Show Boat - starring Eddie Bracken, Stephen Lehew, Marcia King and Robert Mosley
Joseph and the Amazing Technicolor Dreamcoat - starring Christopher Durham
My Fair Lady - starring Noel Harrison and Christine Ebersole
Bye Bye Birdie - starring Barry Williams
The Sound of Music - starring Tovah Feldshuh
The Best Little Whorehouse in Texas - starring Fannie Flagg

1985 
Pump Boys and Dinettes - starring Misty Rowe and Tom Nielsen
A Chorus Line - no featured performers
South Pacific - starring Mary Cadorette and David Holliday
Jesus Christ Superstar - starring Peter Reckell
The Wizard of Oz - starring Andrea McArdle
The Desert Song - starring Stephen Lehew and Mary Ernster
Evita - starring Christine Ebersole and Iris Lieberman (matinees)
Amadeus - starring Bill Hayes and Christopher Durham

1986 
Babes in Arms - starring Iris Lieberman
She Loves Me - starring Mary Ernster and Norman Moses
The 1940's Radio Hour - no featured performers
Two by Two - starring Lawrence McCauley
Something's Afoot - starring Mary Jo Catlett

References

Theatres in Milwaukee
Music venues in Wisconsin
Former theatres in the United States